Parliamentary elections were held in Burkina Faso on 11 May 1997, after the National Assembly completed its first full term since independence. The result was a victory for the Congress for Democracy and Progress, which won 101 of the 111 seats in the National Assembly. Voter turnout was just 44.1%.

Following the election, the Supreme Court annulled the results in four constituencies. The election was re-run in those wards on 19 June, all of which were won by the CDP.

Results

References

Elections in Burkina Faso
Burkina Faso
1997 in Burkina Faso